HD 147018 is a star in the southern constellation of Triangulum Australe. It has a yellow-orange hue with an apparent visual magnitude of 8.30, which is too faint to be seen with the naked eye but can be viewed with a small telescope. The star is located at a distance of 132 light years from the Sun based on parallax, but is drifting closer with a radial velocity of −27.5 km/s.

The stellar classification of HD 147018 is G8/K0V or G9V, matching a late G-type main-sequence star that is generating energy through core hydrogen fusion. It is roughly six billion years old and is spinning with a projected rotational velocity of 1.56 km/s. The star has 93% of the mass of the Sun and 94% of the Sun's radius. The metallicity, or abundance of heavier elements, is higher than in the Sun. The star is radiating 71% of the luminosity of the Sun from its photosphere at an effective temperature of 5,441 K.

In August 2009, two extrasolar planets, HD 147018 b and HD 147018 c, were reported to be orbiting this star. The planets were found using the radial velocity method, using the CORALIE spectrograph at La Silla Observatory, Chile.

See also
 List of extrasolar planets

References

G-type main-sequence stars
Planetary systems with two confirmed planets
Triangulum Australe
CD-61 05387
147018
080250